In biology, the BBCH-scale for canola describes the phenological development of canola plants using the BBCH-scale.

The phenological growth stages and BBCH-identification keys of canola are:

1 Stem elongation may occur earlier than stage 19; in this case continue with stage 20
2 Visibly extended internode n develops between leaf n and leaf n+1

References

 

 

BBCH-scale